Townsend Saunders (born April 20, 1967) is an Olympic silver medalist in wrestling who was a two-time All-American at Arizona State University. In 1987 Saunders became an NCAA Div. II National Champion for California State University-Bakersfield. Townsend was a Goodwill Games gold medalist in 1994 and also won two Pan American Games gold medals in 1991 and 1995.

Biography

Saunders was born in White Sands, New Mexico. Known in college as "Junior" Saunders, he adopted his given name in international competition. In 1985 he was a California State runner-up while wrestling for Torrance High School in Torrance, California. Townsend Saunders has also competed in mixed martial arts for the Ultimate Fighting Championship, at UFC 16 and UFC 18.

Saunders married Tricia, a four-time World Champion FILA wrestler, and is the father of three children.

In 2019, Saunders was inducted into the National Wrestling Hall of Fame as a Distinguished Member.

Mixed martial arts record

|-
| Loss
| align=center | 0–2
| Mikey Burnett
| Decision (unanimous)
| UFC 18
| 
| align=center | 1
| align=center | 15:00
| Kenner, Louisiana, United States
|
|-
| Loss
| align=center | 0–1
| Pat Miletich
| Decision (split)
| UFC 16
| 
| align=center | 1
| align=center | 15:00
| Kenner, Louisiana, United States
| MMA Debut.

Submission grappling record
KO PUNCHES
|- style="text-align:center; background:#f0f0f0;"
| style="border-style:none none solid solid;" | Result
| style="border-style:none none solid solid;" | Opponent
| style="border-style:none none solid solid;" | Method
| style="border-style:none none solid solid;" | Event
| style="border-style:none none solid solid;" | Date
| style="border-style:none none solid solid;" | Round
| style="border-style:none none solid solid;" | Time
| style="border-style:none none solid solid;" | Notes
|-
| Win ||  Andre Pederneiras || Decision || The Contenders || 1997 || 5 || 5:00 ||

References

External links
 
 Townsend "Junior" Saunders at the National Wrestling Hall of Fame site
 

1967 births
Living people
Olympic silver medalists for the United States in wrestling
Wrestlers at the 1992 Summer Olympics
Wrestlers at the 1996 Summer Olympics
American male sport wrestlers
Arizona State University alumni
People from Doña Ana County, New Mexico
American male mixed martial artists
Mixed martial artists utilizing collegiate wrestling
Mixed martial artists utilizing freestyle wrestling
Medalists at the 1996 Summer Olympics
Pan American Games gold medalists for the United States
Pan American Games medalists in wrestling
Wrestlers at the 1991 Pan American Games
Wrestlers at the 1995 Pan American Games
Competitors at the 1994 Goodwill Games
Goodwill Games medalists in wrestling
Medalists at the 1991 Pan American Games
Medalists at the 1995 Pan American Games
Ultimate Fighting Championship male fighters